The Scincosauridae are an extinct family of nectridean lepospondyl amphibians. It includes the genera Scincosaurus and Sauravus. Unlike most other nectrideans, scincosaurids are thought to have been terrestrial.

References

Carboniferous amphibians
Pennsylvanian first appearances
Pennsylvanian extinctions
Holospondyls